Sense-Plan-Act was the predominant robot control methodology through 1985.

 Sense - gather information using the sensors
 Plan - create a world model using all the information, and plan the next move
 Act

SPA is used in iterations: After the acting phase, the sensing phase, and the entire cycle, is repeated.

see also: OODA loop, PDCA, Continual improvement process

Robot architectures